Hathersage railway station serves the village of Hathersage in the Derbyshire Peak District, in England.

History
The original buildings were of timber and have disappeared, with the platforms being rebuilt in masonry. The villagers' initial reaction to proposals to build the railway may have been unenthusiastic. They had already had an unfavourable experience of the 'iron horse' in the form of a traction engine in 1882, which, drawing two heavy carts, had made the roads almost impassable, killing a boy and overturning a mail cart. In addition, a private carriage collided with it, killing one of the occupants.

The station had two platforms either side of a double track connected by an underpass, there was a signal box and sidings to both sides of the running lines to the east of the station. The goods yard was able to handle a full range of goods including live stock, it was equipped with a 10-ton crane.

The station was host to two LMS caravans from 1934 to 1935 and one from 1936 to 1939. A camping coach was positioned here by the London Midland Region from 1954 to 1955.

Stationmasters

Mr. Sharon Morton 1896 - 1908
Thomas Paley 1909 - 1925 (formerly station master at Brightside)
John William Loomes 1925 - 1931 (formerly station master at Castle Bromwich)
R.J. Dowthwaite  from 1931 (also station master at Grindleford)

Facilities
The station is unstaffed, but has been fitted with automatic ticket vending machines to allow passengers to purchase tickets before travelling.  Standard waiting shelters are provided on both platforms and train running information is offered via CIS displays, automated announcements, a pay phone and timetable posters.  Step-free access is available to both platforms, which are linked via a ramped subway.

Service

The typical off-peak service from the station is one train every hour to Sheffield and one to Manchester Piccadilly. On Sundays it is again two-hourly (with some extras in summer).

East Midlands Railway call here with the first service of the day to Manchester and Liverpool Lime Street also on the final return working. All other services are provided by Northern Trains. A normal weekday service operates on most Bank holidays.

References

External links

Railway stations in Derbyshire
DfT Category F2 stations
Former Midland Railway stations
Railway stations in Great Britain opened in 1894
Railway stations served by East Midlands Railway
Northern franchise railway stations